Ramadugu is a village in Ramadugu mandal of Karimnagar district, Telangana State, India.

References 

Villages in Karimnagar district
Mandal headquarters in Karimnagar district